Tavargeri is a village in Dharwad district of Karnataka, India.

Demographics 
As of the 2011 Census of India there were 341 households in Tavargeri and a total population of 1,612 consisting of 822 males and 790 females. There were 188 children ages 0-6.

References

Villages in Dharwad district